The World Union of Jewish Students (WUJS ) (Hebrew: ההתאחדות העולמית של הסטודנטים היהודים; French: L’Union Mondiale des Etudiants Juifs; Spanish: Unión Mundial de Estudiantes Judíos; Russian: Всемирный союз еврейских студентов) is the international, pluralistic, non-partisan umbrella organisation of independent Jewish student groups in 38 countries.

Its headquarters are located in Jerusalem, Israel and its elected President is Yana Naftalieva

History
Founded in 1924 by Hersch Lauterpacht with Albert Einstein as its first President, other previous Chairpersons have included Maurice Perlzweig, Yosef Abramowitz and David Makovsky.

While Albert Einstein served as President of WUJS, his Vice-Presidents included Chaim Weizman, Chaim Nachman Bialik and Sigmund Freud. Einstein was succeeded by Ernst Bergmann, who was himself succeeded by David Ben Gurion, the first Prime Minister of the State of Israel. On January 1, 2020, WUJS elected his new president, Jonathan Braun.

Purpose
The vision of WUJS is that all Jewish students in the world should be connected, represented, and empowered to create strong and dynamic national and regional unions. Its aim is to "foster the unity of Jewish students worldwide and to strive to ensure their participation in the fulfillment of the aspirations of the Jewish people, its continuity, and the development of its religious, spiritual, cultural and social heritage."

Governance and Finance
The WUJS is administered by its executive board, composed of the Presidents/Chair-people of WUJS' largest unions, 2 independent board members elected on a biannual basis and 2 positions given on a biannually rotating basis to presidents/chair-people of two smaller unions who are elected at WUJS general assembly every other year.

President: Jonathan Braun

Treasurer: Matanya Harow

Board Members
 Benjamin Hess
 Esther Offenberg
 Caterina Cognini
 Shelly Portman
 Shimshon Fisher
 Lara Gilkarov
 Dany Levin Prist
 Gabriella Davis
 Yana Naftalieva
 Ruben Thiar
 Yam Atir

Permanent Members
 Australasian Union of Jewish Students (AUJS): Australasia
 European Union of Jewish Students (EUJS): Europe
 National Union of Israeli Students (NUIS): Israel
 Union des étudiants juifs de France (UEJF): France
 Union of Jewish Students of the UK & Ireland (UJS): United Kingdom & Ireland
 South African Union of Jewish Students (SAUJS): South Africa

Rotating Members (As of January 2018)
 Federación Mexicana de Jóvenes Judìos (FeMeJJ): Mexico
 Jüdische österreichische HochschülerInnen (JöH): Austria

As of 2017, the majority of funding came from the Jewish National Fund, World Zionist Organization and World Jewish Congress, in addition to private donations and alumni.

Members

Full Members

Partial Members

Observer Members

Past Leadership

The WUJS Chairperson is elected by the representatives of independent Jewish student unions all over the world to represent the voices of Jewish students within the community, universities, colleges and wider society.

The WUJS Student Awards
The annual WUJS Student Awards were established at WUJS Congress 2014, by Andi Gergely and Yos Tarshish, to recognise the hard work and dedication of Jewish students who have made an exceptional contribution to Jewish life on campus. These students devote countless hours of their time on top of university work, extracurriculars and spending time with their friends to ensure that Jewish student life on campus is thriving, vibrant, safe, and fun. The winners of the awards are listed below. Awards are given in three categories: Union Awards, Individual Awards and Congress Awards. The Individual and Congress Awards were instituted for the third annual WUJS Awards held in January 2017.

Union Awards

Individual Awards

 The Hersch Lauterpacht Award is given each year to a student who has given an outstanding contribution to Jewish student life. The award is given in memory of Hersch Lauterpacht, the Founder and Inaugural Chairperson of WUJS.

Congress Awards

History

1924–1929

The World Union of Jewish Students was founded in 1924 by Hersch Lauterpacht, better known by his Hebrew name Zvi, an Austrian Jew who was aggrieved by the injustices regarding the admittance of Jews to European universities, which at the time had maximum quotas for Jewish students. As this quota system spread throughout Europe, Lauterpacht saw the need to spread his campaigning efforts. From this the concept of an organized international union began to materialize. The union, however, only began to truly develop when Albert Einstein threw his weight behind the union. Then a lecturer in Berlin, Einstein was equally concerned with growing anti-semitism across Europe, himself having been verbally attacked when lecturing. In 1925 Einstein accepted Lauterpacht's invitation to be the union's first President.

On April 30, 1924, the opening Congress was held in the Maccabi Sports Hall in Antwerp, Belgium. The Congress opening was attended by over 2,000 people including the Chief Rabbi of Belgium and the Military Governor of Antwerp. Following this 76 delegates from 17 countries met for 4 days to hear reports on the realities of Jewish students in various countries, and to discuss the problems affecting them. Amongst the sentiments expressed were that "The best method for the work before us appears to be a strong, organized union of all Jewish Students throughout the world." The first Congress resulted in the establishment of the WUJS Executive that would sit in London and the election of Lauterpacht as the first Chairman. For the next few years the role of WUJS was to greatly increase, with new programs developed to redirect students from Hungary, Poland and Russia to Western Europe where there were greater opportunities for Jewish students to be admitted.

1929–1933

Although similar efforts were made to assist Jewish students coming to France, they were less successful, where Jewish students who had made it to France were running into many financial difficulties. In January 1929, Lauterpacht told a convened group of students in Paris, France, that the conditions for Jewish students in Eastern Europe were still bleak, and that in fact anti-Semitism was still on the rise, especially in Germany with the rise of Hitlerist youth. At the thirst WUJS Congress, to which Albert Einstein sent a message highlighting the plight of German Jewry, the opening session was presided over by the renowned British philosopher Samuel Alexander who finished his opening statement with the line "I have become a Zionist", which was met with wild applause. It was decided at the congress that Einstein would remain President alongside a group of Vice-Presidents that would include Chaim Bialik, Sigmund Freud and Chaim Weizmann.

1933–1939

Maurice Perlzweig, a young, British Liberal rabbi, was elected chairperson at the 1933 Congress. By 1936, Perlzweig was also a leader of both the Zionist Organization and the World Jewish Congress, which he had helped to create. The World Jewish Congress was to become one of WUJS' main support mechanisms after the war, and continued to be so up until the present day. In 1939 the offices of WUJS moved to Switzerland for the duration of the Second World War. While little is known of WUJS activities during the period of the war, it is known that WUJS members were particularly active in the French resistance. Following the war, the WUJS offices were moved to Paris. A congress was held shortly after the war, and another in 1948. The third congress after the war was convened in August 1950. Shortly thereafter, the new chairperson, Brian Sandelson, and Secretary General Louis Bartfield launched a new global newsletter, but their intention to make this a monthly publication was never realized as WUJS was sorely lacking in funds. The two main programs of WUJS during this time period were International Study Programs – held in both the US and Israel – and representation on a number of international bodies including UNESCO, the World University Service and the International Union of Students.

1962–1969

A new period of WUJS activity began with the appointment of Dan Bitan as General Secretary in 1962. Bitan re-established connections to member unions in Europe and Latin-America and began preparations for the 13th WUJS Congress to take place in Jerusalem. The Congress saw 50 delegates represent 20 countries, with much of the content focusing on post-war related issues. The Congress condemned Jews living in Germany and refused to recognize the German Jewish student union. The following Congress saw a more liberal approach to the issue and Jewish students were again recognized from Germany, although motions were passed insisting they should move from Germany and Austria.

But the more open policy toward German Jewish students accepted by Congress was perhaps inevitable considering the new Chairperson elected at this event was Michael Hunter, a former Chairperson of the British union, which had long favored the inclusion of German Jewish students within WUJS. In general, the coming years were to be influenced greatly by Hunter's vision. Under his leadership, the World Union began its formal commitment to Zionism and affiliation with the World Zionist Organization. At the same time, perhaps ironically, it began to espouse left-wing political positions in order to continue to be meaningful to a student activist community that was increasingly liberal.

During the summer prior to Hunter's election, WUJS had already begun to move towards a more campaigning union by organizing a seminar in Brussels on "The Situation of the Jews in the Soviet Union." This led to the "European Action on Behalf of Soviet Jewry," a traveling exhibition transported to cities throughout Europe. The ultimate goal of the exhibition, the gathering of signatures for a petition, was achieved quite successfully with 15,000 signatures from the United Kingdom and another 15,000 from across Europe. The campaign received a tremendous amount of publicity, from local newspapers to the broadcast media, including the BBC World Service and Israel Radio. in May 1966, the WUJS campaign climaxed in London with a demonstration over 1,000 people strong in front of the Soviet Embassy.

The 1967 Six-Day War changed the political dynamics WUJS operated in. While the war won Israel unprecedented support from most sectors of the Jewish community, the new territorial realities of 1967 prompted a strong wave of anti-Israel sentiment from other camps. This "New Left" sentiment was heard loudly on campus and forced the Jewish student movement to reassess its positions regarding Israel, Zionism and its own self-definition. Such assessments began at the 14th WUJS Congress, held at Ramat Rachel months after the war. The venue itself was symbolic, as only two months earlier it had been an outpost along the Jordanian border. With Israel's June victory, it had become a part of extended Jerusalem, miles from Jordanian territory. The Congress included Shabbat in the newly liberated Old City and was addresses by Hebrew University Chancellor, Labor Minister Yigal Allon, and Honorary WUJS President, David Ben-Gurion. Also symbolic of new perspectives was the election of British-born Chairperson Mike Hunter and Latin American-born Secretary General Edy Kaufman.

The Congress itself reflected the delicate balance required between the internal Jewish need for support for Israel and Zionism and the external concerns captivating so many young Jews around the world. On the one hand, Congress determined that WUJS should add a staff member to its Secretariat in the form of a Political Officer, noting that it was the "duty of WUJS to struggle for the solution of humanitarian, political and international problems." At the same time, Congress turned its attention to the matter of Zionism. It was noted that Israel required "significant aliyah and that no responsible Jewish student body" could "neglect its responsibility to aliyah." The Congress resolved that WUJS appoint an Aliyah Officer whose role would be to encourage aliyah from member unions. In addition, the Israel office of WUJS was asked to prepare an adequate framework to deal with the social absorption of students, including the establishment of a hostel for WUJS members studying at the Hebrew University and/or working in Jerusalem."

Following the Six-Day War, the WZO, with its new Executive Chairman Aryeh Pincus, sought to reinvigorate itself. Among the routes toward this goal was the proposed formal inclusion of youth and students within the WZO. Explaining the rationale behind WUJS' agreement to affiliate with the WZO, Chairperson Hunter wrote of the "serious lack of continuity in Jewish leadership" due largely to the fact that youth were "almost totally absent from both Jewish and Zionist institutions." The World Union believed that this alienation represented a "grave danger ... for the future of the Jewish People" and thus in spite of "certain doubts and reservations" had chosen to join hands with the official Zionist movement. The relationship between WUJS and the Zionist establishment was tenuous. While it was "one of the commonest cliches repeated by Jewish leaders [that] the youth, including of course the students, should be the vanguard in the Zionist organizations," Hunter noted, in reality these young people were not given sufficient representation and were used "purely for decorative purposes." Furthermore, WUJS believed, representation in general within the Zionist Organization was problematic, as the election of delegates from many countries was non-democratic.

The Zionist Congress of 1968 resolved "to grant voting and all other delegates' privileges" to youth, students and aliyah movements and to see to it "that the competent authorities take appropriate steps for ensuring that such delegations take part in all future Congresses as delegates with full rights." The WZO constitution was also amended to grant youth, student and aliyah movements seats in the Zionist General Council that directed policy between Congresses. The Congress took very seriously issues relating specifically to the student age group, noting that campus Jewry, in particular, was faced with the task of combating anti-Israel sentiment. They therefore resolved to strengthen WZO efforts "among Jewish students in the Diaspora organized in bodies like WUJS" and recommended the provision of a special budget toward that end.

Against this backdrop, the WUJS Executive staged a walk-out from the 1969 Zionist General Council meetings. Led by Secretary General Edy Kaufman, WUJS representatives came prepared with a series of demands: that the WZO convene a Zionist Congress – the movement's formal decision-making assembly – within six months and that the delegates to this gathering be elected democratically; that Zionist ideology be discussed seriously within the WZO; and that the WZO provide a forum for youth and students to conduct their own debate on Zionist ideology. When, in the end, the General Council adopted a resolution that did not stipulate an earlier date for the upcoming Zionist Congress, the WUJS delegation determined to leave the assembly. This foreshadowed strained relations that would continue between WUJS and the Zionist establishment for years to come.

1969–1986

During these days of student radicalism WUJS began to see meaningful participation from the United States. Though support for independent student initiatives was scarce—as all communal funding for U.S. Jewish students was already earmarked for Hillel — by early 1968 WUJS branches were beginning to function in California and Pennsylvania. In 1969, a group of Jewish students came together in Brewster, New York to create the North American Jewish Students Network. "Network," headed by Malcolm Hoenlein, became the first North American affiliate of WUJS. By the 15th Congress held in Arad in July 1970, WUJS had indeed expanded on many fronts. For the first time, Congress welcomed an official delegation from Network, the new North American student organization. Thirty-five other countries were also represented, and Chilean Edy Rauch was elected Chairperson.

Continuing the trends set in motion in the 1960s, Congress adopted a general platform opposed to the political, economic or cultural oppression of any people. In particular, they called for the withdrawal of "all foreign forces" from Vietnam, Cambodia, Thailand and Laos, lauded the liberation efforts in Africa, Latin America and Asia, and condemned "the colonial war waged by Portugal against the peoples of Angola, Bissau, Guinea and Mozambique," "the racist policies of the regimes of South Africa and Rhodesia," the "fascist" leadership of Greece and "the intervention of the armed forces of the Warsaw Pact in Czechoslovakia." They also gave a great deal of attention to the Zionist movement. They reaffirmed pre-existing policy insisting that the Middle East conflict could only be resolved if the Palestinian nation were given the right of self- determination and called upon the Israeli Government to recognize this right immediately. At the same time, they condemned acts of terror on the part of Palestinian organizations. WUJS attracted major hostility from the Zionist establishment, in the months leading up to the Zionist Congress, as countries throughout the world conducted membership drives for Congress delegates, WUJS member unions suffered attacks on local levels, internationally, the WUJS budget, and thus its lifeblood, was threatened. In November 1970, the special budget given by the WZO for WUJS' Zionist work was cut, leaving WUJS unable to participate in the upcoming elections. Appeals to the Zionist leadership were to no avail. As the Zionist Congress of 1972 approached, it appeared that WUJS was sure to be destroyed. Indeed, political parties in Israel began presenting proposals for an alternative to WUJS, a world Zionist student organization of some kind. Beyond a proposed replacement for WUJS, this type of organization was truly threatening as it represented an attempt to base student membership in the Zionist movement on the Israeli political party system. This was in fact the polar opposite of what WUJS had hoped to initiate within the WZO, representation of the Jewish world without ties to party politics.

Under the leadership of President Ron Finkel (formerly of the Australian Union of Jewish Students) in the mid 1970s, and of Polish-born Aneta Josefowicz (formerly of the Danish Union of Jewish Students) in the late 1970s, WUJS ran a summer camp in Yugoslavia for Jewish students living in countries behind the Iron Curtain. In any given year, the micropolitics in Czechoslovakia, Hungary and Romania determined whether local students would be permitted to attend. WUJS officers active during these years included Ignacio Klich, Jev Gollin, and Tom Price. In 1977, Talya Fishman launched Project Areivim, a program in which qualified university graduates (American, Israeli and Latin American) took up volunteer placements that had been created for them in Jewish communities throughout Europe, and, at the same time, encouraged local Jewish University students to document the history and culture of their own Jewish communities. In its first two years, Areivim volunteers served in London, Amsterdam, Belgrade, Madrid, and Rome.

In September 1979 the WUJS congress was held in Jerusalem, and Uruguayan Alfredo Trapunksy was elected WUJS Chairperson by an overwhelming majority. At this congress, one of the major unions (UJS – The British Union) walked out owing to differences regarding the management of WUJS, and in 1980 the WUJS offices were transferred from London to Jerusalem. As WUJS took on a more overtly Zionist orientation, Education Officer, Shifra Horn (formerly of the National Union of Israeli Students) organized a number of seminars in Israel, particularly targeting smaller communities such as Turkey, Iran and countries of Latin America. It was during this period that Project Areivim became intertwined with the Jewish Agency's Youth and HeHalutz Department. This was somewhat ironic, as it had been initiated as a project that would help young European Jews take greater interest and pride in the rich, centuries-old Jewish heritages of their respective Diaspora locales.

In 1983, Dani Katz, a former AUJS vice President, was elected Chairperson, and he began negotiations toward a union between WUJS and the World Jewish Congress, a union which would help to alleviate the ongoing struggle with the Zionist system and which remains intact until today.

With tensions between WUJS and the Zionist community beginning to subside, the organization was able to return to the activist concerns of previous years. Indeed, the union entered one of its most active periods in history. In 1984 after Dani Katz stepped down for personal reasons, the Executive appointed David Makovsky as Chairperson. He was a former Network President and leader of the U.S. student campaign for Soviet Jewry. In September 1984, he walked out of a meeting of the World Presidium on Soviet Jewry because they would not include the plight of Ethiopian Jewry in their discussions.

1987–1988

In 1987, Makovsky was succeeded by another North American, Yosef Abramowitz (Yossi), who at 22 years old when he assumed the chair was the youngest to date. In spite of his young age, Abramowitz maintained and expanded upon the high level of output achieved during the preceding years. He saw to it that WUJS continued to champion the cause of Ethiopian Jewry, organizing an international petition, hosting an international conference on the topic and implementing an awareness campaign featuring Ethiopian bracelets. During Abramowitz's tenure, desks were also established in the Jerusalem office to build public awareness on the plight of Russian and Yemenite Jewries, and to coordinate efforts between local communities and American and Israeli government agencies working on their behalf. 

Of necessity, programming would gradually move away from the grand campaign format of preceding decades and turn toward the internal growth and development of individuals. The most striking of these new programs was the WUJS Women's Project, a leadership training initiative for young Jewish women throughout the world. While the initial proposal for the project was written by Abramowitz, the idea took shape during the term of his successor, Heather Harris. Harris, who took office in 1990, was the third in a string of North American Chairpersons as well as the second woman ever to hold the position. Global communication and cooperation was made increasingly viable as the availability of fax communication brought all unions into radically closer contact. It thus became easier to share even in the advances of member unions operating oceans away. In South Africa, for example, Harris accompanied a SAUJS delegation on their meeting with the African National Congress only months after the ban on the organization was lifted. This marked the beginning of an ongoing working relationship between SAUJS and the ANC.

1991–1998
Indeed, WUJS was now active on many fronts within the spectrum of Zionist activity. Committed to the rescue and absorption of Jewish immigrant communities, it was also concerned with the internal struggles of the community in Israel. In January 1991, a matter of days before the outbreak of the Gulf War, WUJS hosted a conference entitled 'Paths to Peace,' including Jewish students from around the world and Israeli students, both Jewish and Arab.

Of necessity, programming would gradually move away from that at even-handedness. Palestinian leadership was included in each program, and groups were often hosted at the home of the Egyptian Ambassador. One such group to visit Israel during Dan Levy's term was the Youth League of the African National Congress. The tour, run in cooperation with the South African Union of Jewish Students, was the first official visit of an ANC delegation to Israel. On other political fronts, WUJS organized a worldwide campaign on behalf of Syrian Jewry as well as a critical visit to the Jewish communities and political bodies of war-torn Yugoslavia. Still, by the end of Levy's tenure, it was clear that while political crises and struggles would always mark the Jewish historical landscape, this was no longer the major thrust of Jewish student concern. The new priorities of literacy and personal leadership set in motion during Levy's term were fostered and enhanced by subsequent Chairpersons.

Australian David Gold, who assumed the position in 1994, termed the new direction of the World Union 'Jewish Revitalization.' In his own statements, he confessed that this would 'not generate media publicity or meetings with politicians, it [was] an internally directed issue.' But popular or not, the notion took hold. It was formalized by Belgian Claude Kandiyoti, the Chairperson who in 1996 produced 'The WUJS Vision,' a document stressing the idea that 'a Jew of substance is a Jew of knowledge.' More than a mere slogan, the statement reflected the new array of priority issues and program areas within WUJS, among them Jewish literacy, the connection to Israel, and the promotion of tolerance and pluralism, it also incorporated the emerging theme of Israel-Diaspora Relations that would fully evolve during the coming years.

At the extraordinary Congress of 1997, celebrating a century of Modern Zionism, Ilanit Sasson Melchior was elected WUJS’ first Israeli Chairperson. During her term, Sasson Melchior continued Kandiyoti's emphasis on pro-active, educational programming and at the same time expanded on the Israel-Diaspora theme of the preceding years. As part of the WUJS vision of those times, every member union visiting Israel was expected to take part in a meeting with Israeli students to explore similarities and differences. In 1998, together with the National Union of Israeli Students, WUJS spearheaded a campaign entitled 'Am Echad' to send Israeli students to Diaspora communities for Passover.

See also
 CampusJ
 Chabad on Campus Foundation
 Hillel: The Foundation for Jewish Campus Life
 MASORTI on Campus
 Religion and the internet

References

External links
WUJS Official website
 

Jewish youth organizations
Zionist organizations
Student organizations established in 1924
Student organizations in Israel
International student religious organizations
International organizations based in Israel
1924 establishments in Belgium
World Zionist Organization